Staniša Radmanović (born October 8, 1940) is a Yugoslav sprint canoer who competed in the 1960s. Competing in three Summer Olympics, he earned his best finish of eighth in the K-4 1000 m event at Tokyo in 1964.

References
Sports-reference.com profile

1940 births
Canoeists at the 1960 Summer Olympics
Canoeists at the 1964 Summer Olympics
Canoeists at the 1968 Summer Olympics
Living people
Olympic canoeists of Yugoslavia
Yugoslav male canoeists
Serbian male canoeists